Schiffsbetrieb Walensee is a transportation company in Switzerland. It operates a small fleet of ships on the Walensee, linking communities around the lake.

Services 

 the company operates two routes on the lake:

 Längskurs: seasonal (April–October) service between Weesen and Walenstadt, operating the full length of the lake.
 Querkurs: year-round service between Murg and Quinten.

References

External links 
 

Shipping companies of Switzerland
Transport in the canton of St. Gallen
Transport in the canton of Glarus